Arlington may refer to:
Arlington (Jacksonville), a neighborhood of Jacksonville
Arlington, Citrus County, Florida, an unincorporated community north of Inverness